Shyam Sunder Sharma is an Indian print artist, author, and poet.

Childhood & education
Sharma was born on 8 February 1941 in Mathura Uttar Pradesh. He was exposed to printmaking early in his life through his father, who ran a printing press in Baraily. He also got an opportunity to learn the art of printmaking from his maternal grandfather. Later, he enrolled in Lucknow University to receive a higher education in Fine Arts.

When asked how he got involved in printmaking, Sharma said, "While at my father's printing press, the prints were developed from machines, at the College of Arts and Crafts in Lucknow I learnt how to develop handmade prints and got hooked on it."

Achievements
Sharma started his career in 1966 as a lecturer at College of Arts and Crafts, Patna where he rose to become Head of the Department of Printmaking and later the Principal.

His works have been displayed in solo and group exhibitions around the world. He has also been a member of the General Council of Lalit Kala Academy and the Chairman of the Advisory Board of National Modern Art Gallery Delhi.

Publications
Sharma has authored numerous books. Prominent among them are Safed Sanp (a poetry collection), Syah, Dekha Dekhi Baat (plays), Gandhi Aur Suktiyan, Kashth Chhapa Kala, Chitrakala aur Bihar, and Patna Qualam (Philosophy, Art history).

Awards
 National Award by Lalit Kala Academy Delhi
 Padmashree by the Government of India
 International Print Biennial in Netherlands

References

Living people
1941 births
Indian printmakers
20th-century Indian writers
21st-century Indian writers
20th-century Indian poets
21st-century Indian poets